The Jonima family was an Albanian noble family that held a territory around Lezhë (northern Albania), as a vassal of Arbër, Serbia and Ottoman Empire, active in the 13th to 15th centuries. The Jonima, like most Albanian noble families, were part of a fis or clan. It is also said that they had close ties to the Kastrioti tribe.

Name and toponomy
The name appears in multiple forms in historical sources, such as Gonoma, Guonimi, Gjonëmi, Ghionoma, Giolma, Gionima, Gonome, Jonema, Jonoma etc. The term occurs widely in toponymy, albeit in considerably deformed versions, such as Quku i Gjormit of Xhani, Gjormi of Rrjolli, Brija e Gjormit of Gruemirë, Gjormi of Grizha to the north of Shkodër, Gjormi in Elbasan and Kodra e Gjormakvet in Dajçi of Zadrima. The form Gjonëmi can be found in Lurja and Luma, and Gjunumi is found near Dukat nearby Vlorë. Marin Barleti mentions Sylva Jonimorum in Kurbini, and Gjon Muzaka in 1510 mentions Guonyms in Kurbini; Gionami, Gionemi or Gionimi are also recorded in 1640 and 1671, also in Kurbini. These have been identified with the modern Gjolmi of Kurbini.

The village of Gjonimi (modern-day Gjonëm) appears in the Ottoman defter of 1467 as a hass-ı mir-liva and derbendci settlement in the vilayet of Akçahisar with six households, represented by: Ozgyr Primiqyri, Dhuka Lugras, Pal Gjonima, Gjergj Gjonima, Peter Koka, and Gjergj Gjonima.

History

As a personal name, Jonima already appears in 1204-1209 among the inscriptions of Demetrio d'Albano. The first member of the family itself was mentioned in sources dating to the early 13th century as a vassal of Dhimitër Progoni in the Principality of Arbër. At the end of the 13th century, two powerful branches of a family with the surname Jonima are mentioned in Durrës and Shkodra. In 1274, a Savasto Yonima appears among the Albanian leaders of the parts of Durrës held by Naples. Another member of the family, Vladislav Jonima, is mentioned in sources in 1306, with the title of župan, while in service of Stephen Uroš II Milutin of Serbia. A catholic, he was acknowledged by the Pope as a ruler of a territory around Lezhë in 1319. Vladislav Jonima had the title of Count of Dioclea and of the seaside Albania. After the Ottoman victory in the Battle of Savra in 1385, the territory of Albania went out of the control of Balšić family. At the end of 14th century Jonima family reappears in sources when Dhimitër Jonima was lord of a territory between Mat and Lezhë. The Dukagjini family and the Jonima family competed for the territory on the both sides of the river Drin, and the Kastrioti family soon challenged the rule of the Dukagjini family over the territory between Mati and Drin. In 1402, as part of the Albanian nobility that served as Ottoman vassals, Dhimitër Jonima fought alongside Bayezid I's forces at the Battle of Ankara.

The Jonima family was linked to the Zaharia family and the Dushmani family. At the beginning of the 15th century Šufadaj (an important former marketplace on the Adriatic sea, near Lezhë) was a possession of the Jonima family before in 1428 it came under the control of Gjon Kastrioti.

After Stefan Jonima, a former outlaw, asked the Venetian Senate to grant him his former possessions, he was awarded with control of the Kurtes village in 1445. 

A Zorzi and Piero, who were recorded in 1542, were stratiots stemming from the Jonima family. In 1569, a Joannes Dionami figure was part of ecclesiastical clergy of Lezha.

Members
 Vladislav Jonima
 Savasto Jonima
 Dhimitër Jonima
 Stefan Jonima
 Zorzi Jonima
 Piero Jonima
 Vito Jonima
 Stefano Jonima

Names of other notable members of this family include: Vikt, John, Bitri, Marin, Florio, Fior, and Guido.

References

External links 
 Fior Jonima: A Ravaged Land, 1470 - Response of Fior Jonima to the Venetian tax authorities who had inquired of him as to why so little revenue had been arriving from Albania.
  Gjoni (Gjonaj) Origin from Lezhë

Jonima family
13th-century Albanian people
14th-century Albanian people
15th-century Albanian people